Koštice is a municipality and village in Louny District in the Ústí nad Labem Region of the Czech Republic. It has about 600 inhabitants.

Administrative parts
Villages of Vojnice, Vojničky and Želevice are administrative parts of Koštice.

History
The first written mention of Koštice is from 1373.

References

Villages in Louny District